Laura Ross may refer to:

 Laura Ross (chess player), American chess player
 Laura Ross (politician), Canadian politician